Ancylosis sareptalla is a species of snout moth in the genus Ancylosis. It was described by Gottlieb August Wilhelm Herrich-Schäffer in 1861. It and is found in both Russia and southern Europe.

References

Moths described in 1861
sareptalla
Moths of Europe